Thang (also called Dhothang, Thanga Chathang) is a small village in the Leh district of Ladakh, India. It is in the historical Chorbat region of Baltistan, divided between India and Pakistan by the 1972 Line of Control. Thang is part of the Nubra tehsil and the Turtuk community development block.

The village was seized from Pakistan along with three other villages in the area as a result of the Indo-Pakistani War of 1971. It is 2.5 kilometers from the line of control. The area's population is largely Balti.

History
See history of Turtuk and nearby areas.

Demographics
According to the 2011 census of India, Thang had 16 households in that year. The effective literacy rate (i.e. the literacy rate of population excluding children aged 6 and below) was 63.41%.

See also
 Chewang Rinchen
 Indo-Pakistani War of 1971

References

External links
 Jitaditya Narzary, Thang, That Village Beyond the LOC, Travelling Slacker (blog), 31 July 2019.

Villages in Nubra tehsil